Khatarah (alternatively spelled Khatare or Hatarah) is a town located in the Tel Kaif District of the Ninawa Governorate in northern Iraq. It belongs to the disputed territories of Northern Iraq.

Khatarah has a mainly Yazidi population.

References

Populated places in Nineveh Governorate
Yazidi populated places in Iraq
Nineveh Plains